David Clarkson is a soccer player who spent 12 years in the Australian National Soccer League (NSL). He also played in England, making 13 appearances for Brighton & Hove Albion in the Football League Second Division. He also spent three years in Hong Kong.

Early life
Clarkson was born in England before emigrating to Australia with his family at a young age. His father, Brian, was a referee.

Playing career
Clarkson began his career in Tasmania, playing for Rapid and Hobart Juventus before moving to the mainland.

References

Living people
1968 births
Australian soccer players
Queensland Lions FC players
Adelaide City FC players
Caroline Springs George Cross FC players
Brighton & Hove Albion F.C. players
Heidelberg United FC players
Happy Valley AA players
Sing Tao SC players
South China AA players
South Melbourne FC players
National Soccer League (Australia) players
Association football midfielders